Thompson Street may refer to:
Thompson Street (album), an album by Brady Seals
Thompson Street (Manhattan), a street in Manhattan, New York City